Mary Pudlat (1923–2001) was a Canadian Inuk artist. She was born in Puvirnituq, Quebec, and married a Samuelie Pudlat in 1943 on Baffin Island. They were semi-nomadic before settling down in Cape Dorset in 1963. Pudlat began to draw and sculpt soapstone in the 1960s and 1970s. When her husband died in 1979, she switched to full time drawing. Her art depicts aspects of native Inuit life, such as traditional hunting and fishing scenes.

See also 
 Janet Kigusiuq
 Agnes Nanogak
 Angotigolu Teevee
 Shuvinai Ashoona

References

1923 births
2001 deaths
Inuit artists
People from Nunavik
Women printmakers
20th-century Canadian printmakers
Artists from Nunavut
20th-century Canadian women artists
20th-century Canadian artists
Canadian Inuit women
Canadian women illustrators
Artists from Quebec
Inuit from Quebec
Inuit from the Northwest Territories
Inuit from Nunavut
People from Kinngait